One of the two Maine incumbents was re-elected and the other retired.

See also 
 List of United States representatives from Maine
 United States House of Representatives elections, 1972

1972
Maine
1972 Maine elections